Saint-Jean-d'Ataux (Limousin: Sent Joan d'Astaus) is a commune in the Dordogne department in Nouvelle-Aquitaine in southwestern France.

Population

See also
Communes of the Dordogne department

References

Communes of Dordogne